Qasemabad (also Romanized as Qāsemābād) is a village in Mehregan Rural District, in the Central District of Parsian County, Hormozgan Province, Iran. At the 2006 census, its population was 49, in 11 families.

References 

Populated places in Parsian County